Daniel Strigel (born 13 February 1975) is a German fencer. He won a bronze medal in the team épée event at the 2004 Summer Olympics.

References

External links
 

1975 births
Living people
German male fencers
Olympic fencers of Germany
Fencers at the 2000 Summer Olympics
Fencers at the 2004 Summer Olympics
Olympic bronze medalists for Germany
Olympic medalists in fencing
Sportspeople from Mannheim
Medalists at the 2004 Summer Olympics